Zygaena exulans, the mountain burnet or Scotch burnet, is a moth of the family Zygaenidae.

Subspecies
Subspecies include:
Zygaena exulans exulans (European Alps)
Zygaena exulans abruzzina Burgeff, 1926
Zygaena exulans apfelbecki Rebel, 1910
Zygaena exulans pyrenaica Burgeff, 1926
Zygaena exulans subochracea White, 1872
Zygaena exulans vanadis Dalman, 1816

Distribution and habitat
It is also present in Scotland, in Scandinavia and in northern Russia. These moths inhabit mountain lawns and northern moors.

Description
The body is densely haired. The forewings are black-gray in males, matt gray in the females, almost translucent and with a metallic sheen. They have four distinct red dots and a red basal elongated stain. The spot on the wing root is wedge-shaped, the others are oval or round. The hindwings are red with a gray outer edge and black fringes. The antennae are club-shaped.

These moths have an aposemantic coloration. In the event of an attack by predators such as birds and lizards they emit a liquid containing cyanide.

This species is rather similar to Zygaena lonicerae, Zygaena loti and Zygaena purpuralis.

The eggs are pale yellow, relatively large and oval. They are velvety black, with yellowish markings on each segment and short white hair. The pupa is brown-black and lies in a gray-white, thin cocoon.

Biology
Adults usually fly in sunshine from late May to September, depending on the location. Larvae feed on crowberry (Empetrum nigrum) in northern Europe. Elsewhere they are polyphagous, mainly feeding on Helianthemum nummularium, Anthyllis vulneraria, Dryas octopetala, Silene acaulis, Astragalus alpinus, Carex, Polygonum viviparum, Salix, Thymus, Vaccinium uliginosum, Chamorchis alpina, Betula nana, Viscaria alpina, Thalictrum alpinum, Cassiope tetragona, Bartsia alpina and Saxifraga aizoides. This species hibernates in the form of a larva.

Gallery

References

Zygaena
Moths of Europe
Moths described in 1792